Pepper's Pow Wow is the debut album led by Native American saxophonist and composer Jim Pepper recorded in 1971 and first released on Herbie Mann's Embryo label.

Reception

The Allmusic site awarded the album 4 stars stating "while Pepper's Pow Wow is not strictly a jazz record, nor is it a folk record or a rock record, it is something far greater than merely the sum of those things".

Track listing 
All compositions by Gilbert Pepper except as indicated
 "Witchitai-To (Chant) / Witchitai-To (Song)" (Traditional/Jim Pepper) – 7:17
 "Squaw Song" – 3:50
 "Rock Stomp Indian Style" – 2:07
 "Senecas (As Long as the Grass Shall Grow)" (Peter La Farge) – 5:48
 "Ya Na Ho" – 5:42 	
 "Slow War Dance" – 1:51
 "Nommie-Nommie (When the Roll Is Called Up Yonder)" (Traditional) – 2:37
 "Newly-Weds Song" – 3:01
 "Fast War Dance/Now War Dance" (Gilbert Pepper/Billy Cobham, Chuck Rainey, Jim Pepper, Larry Coryell, Tom Grant) – 	2:24
 "Drums" (La Farge) – 4:20

Personnel 
Jim Pepper – tenor saxophone, soprano saxophone, drums, bells, rattles, shakers, vocals
Ravie Pepper – flute, bamboo flute, shakers, vocals
Tom Grant – piano, shakers, vocals
Larry Coryell – guitar
Jerry Jemmott, Chuck Rainey – electric bass
Billy Cobham, Spider Rice – drums
Gib Pepper – drums, bells, rattles, shakers, vocals, arranger
Arif Mardin – arranger (track 5)

References 

Jim Pepper albums
1971 albums
Embryo Records albums
Albums arranged by Arif Mardin